Leonard Victor (Len) Waters (20 June 1924 – 24 August 1993) was the first Aboriginal Australian military aviator, and the only one to serve as a fighter pilot in the Royal Australian Air Force (RAAF) during World War II. Aboriginal people at the time suffered significant discrimination and disadvantages in Australian society, such as restrictions on movement, residence, employment, and access to services and citizenship. Born in northern New South Wales and raised in Queensland, Waters was working as a shearer when he joined the RAAF in 1942. Training initially as a mechanic, he volunteered for flying duties and graduated as a sergeant pilot in 1944. He flew P-40 Kittyhawks in the South West Pacific theatre, where he completed 95 missions, mainly close air support. By the end of the war he had risen to the rank of warrant officer. Following his discharge from the RAAF in 1946, he attempted to start a regional airline but was unable to secure financial backing and government approval. He went back to shearing, and died in 1993 at the age of 69.

Early life
The fourth of 11 children to Donald and Grace Waters (née Bennett), Len Waters was born at Euraba Mission, near Boomi in northern New South Wales on 20 June 1924. He grew up at Nindigully, near St George, Queensland, and was educated to the seventh grade at Nindigully State School. Hearing tales of pioneering aviators Charles Kingsford Smith, Amy Johnson, Bert Hinkler and Charles Lindbergh, and reading stories of Biggles, Flash Gordon, and Buck Rogers, he had, as he put it, his "head in the clouds" from an early age. Waters left school when he was 14 to support his family, working alongside his father as a ring barker. He was paid 10 shillings per week, for a seven-day week, less than one-sixth of the average wage at the time. In 1939, he began working as a shearer.

RAAF career
Although the military had officially barred or restricted the recruitment of Aboriginal people in earlier periods, these impediments were significantly relaxed after Japan entered World War II, and Australia came under direct attack for the first time. Waters volunteered for service in the Royal Australian Air Force (RAAF) on 24 August 1942, at Brisbane, and was accepted. He began training as an aircraft mechanic, but later volunteered for flying service, and commenced initial training at Somers, Victoria, in December 1943. The aircrew interviewer thought he looked "a bit rough" but "should make a fighter". Waters believed his lack of education would be a disadvantage, and studied nights to make up for it. Keen to be a pilot, he was concerned that he would be allocated to duty as a wireless operator because he showed an aptitude for Morse transmission early on. He was also asked to imagine himself as the tail gunner in a Lancaster or Halifax heavy bomber, to which he replied, "I had a very disappointed look on my face, sir!" So convinced was he that he would not achieve his dream of becoming an aviator, Waters made three separate bets against himself being selected, and had to pay out £15 when he was nevertheless chosen.

Waters undertook his basic flight instruction at No. 1 Elementary Flying Training School in Narrandera, New South Wales, where he flew De Havilland Tiger Moths. He completed his training on CAC Wirraways and received his wings as a sergeant pilot at No. 5 Service Flying Training School in Uranquinty. Posted to No. 2 Operational Training Unit at Mildura, Victoria, he converted to P-40 Kittyhawk fighters. Once, while he was on leave, Waters was reportedly gaoled in Moree, New South Wales, for not carrying an identity card, which was one of the racially discriminatory institutions affecting Aboriginal people at the time. On 14 November 1944, he was posted to No. 78 Squadron, a fighter unit based on the island of Noemfoor, off Dutch New Guinea. When he arrived, he was allocated a P-40 Kittyhawk. By chance, a previous pilot had nicknamed the plane "Black Magic" and painted those words on its nose. Waters found the name of his plane an amusing coincidence and chose to retain it.

By this stage of the war, Japanese aircraft were almost non-existent in the South West Pacific theatre; No. 78 Squadron's main role was ground attack, bombing and strafing enemy positions. Waters flew 95 sorties from Noemfoor, and later from the air bases at Morotai and Tarakan, in Borneo. During one mission, his aircraft was struck by a 37 mm cannon shell that embedded itself behind him in the cockpit without detonating. He flew for another two hours, with the possibility of the shell exploding at any time, a situation he likened to having a loaded gun against his head. "I'll tell you what", he said after returning to base, "that was the best landing I ever made". On 1 January 1945, he was promoted to flight sergeant. By the end of the war, Waters was commanding operations whose personnel included commissioned officers. A colleague described him as a "gaunt, genial figure, humble despite his daring feats". As well as flying, Waters held the RAAF middleweight boxing title.

One of Len Waters' brothers, Donald Edward (Jimmy) Waters, had served as an infantryman with the Australian Army during the war. With the end of the Pacific War in September 1945, Len considered volunteering for the Australian component of the British Commonwealth Occupation Force in Japan, if his brother did also. Jim declined at the time (he later changed his mind), so Len returned to Australia and left the Air Force with the rank of warrant officer on 18 January 1946.

Post-war life and legacy

After returning to Australia, Waters attempted to start a regional airline serving South West Queensland, but he was not able to secure finance or bureaucratic agreement. He reportedly wrote four letters seeking government approval, but never received a reply. He never flew a plane again. Although racism in the military during World War II was considered to be minimal, Waters and other Aboriginal people who had served their country found that the skills they had acquired were not valued in peacetime. He wrote later that, having put off his uniform, he simply "returned to being a blackfellow".

Four weeks after his discharge from the Air Force, Waters married Gladys Saunders, with whom he raised six children. He worked as an automotive mechanic, but was forced to cease by union rules, which required him to serve an apprenticeship. Waters was then briefly employed by a local council in Queensland as a road worker, before returning to shearing, which took him away from his family to properties stretching from North Queensland to Victoria. He personally estimated that he sheared a million sheep during his life.

Waters applied for housing commission accommodation and was allocated a house at Inala, Brisbane, in August 1956. He eventually bought the property and lived there for 33 years. He died on 24 August 1993 at the age of 69 in Cunnamulla, and was buried in St George Cemetery.

In 1995–96, Waters was commemorated in several ways: Australia Post depicted his portrait on a stamp and that of his P-40 Kittyhawk fighter "Black Magic" on an aérogramme, as part of its Australia Remembers series; a brand of port was named after his personal Kittyhawk; Len Waters Place, a park in Inala, was opened; Moree Plains Shire Council dedicated Leonard Waters Park in Boggabilla, New South Wales; and Len Waters Street in Ngunnawal, Australian Capital Territory, was named after him. In 2003, Balonne Shire Council erected a monument to Waters and another local RAAF identity, Squadron Leader John Jackson, in St George. The suburb of Len Waters Estate was established in the City of Liverpool, New South Wales, in 2009. In 2011, the Sutherland Shire Council recognised Len Waters' memory and achievements by dedicating Len Waters Park, with a memorial plinth and plaque, at Timbrey Circuit, Barden Ridge, New South Wales. In October 2020, a new building at RAAF Base Williamtown was named in his honour. In 2018 Peter Rees published The Missing Man, a biography of Waters.

Notes

References

Further reading
 

1924 births
1993 deaths
Australian World War II pilots
Indigenous Australian military personnel
People from Queensland
People from the North West Slopes
Royal Australian Air Force airmen
Royal Australian Air Force personnel of World War II
Military personnel from New South Wales